Urbanya is a commune in the Pyrénées-Orientales department in southern France.

Geography 
Urbanya is located in the canton of Les Pyrénées catalanes and in the arrondissement of Prades.

History 
Urbanya is mentioned for the first time on 16 June 1186, as being owned by the lord of Conat, on an act signed by Guillem-Bernard de Paracols, husband of Blanche de Conat.

In September 1907, a rain and hailstorm falls on Urbanya, damaging and sometimes destroying the roads and bridges, as well with several houses.

Population

See also
Communes of the Pyrénées-Orientales department

References

Communes of Pyrénées-Orientales